Radio Zeta is a radio station in Montenegro. Its headquarters are in Podgorica. Radio Zeta is operated through TuneIn.

Radio stations in Montenegro
Mass media in Podgorica